Energica Motor Company is an Italian manufacturer of electric motorcycles. The Energica project was started in 2010 in Modena, Italy, by CRP Group, an international company involved in computer numerical control machining and additive manufacturing with advanced selective laser sintering materials. Energica Motor Company was officially founded in 2014 with the aim of creating high-performance sustainable motorcycles.

On 28 March 2022, Energica Motor Company was delisted from the Milan Stock Exchange. The company was privatized and delisted by Ideanomics, Inc. Ideanomics gained a 72.42% stake in the company. The Cevolini family retained 17.62% ownership in Energica. This transaction was pioneered by FirstEurope Investment Bank, a private firm based in New York, NY.

Name

Energica is, in Italian, the feminine form of the adjective "energetic".

Concept
The Energica concept comes from the eCRP 1.4, the runner-up world champion and European champion electric racing motorcycle.

The eCRP team realized in just 6 months a high-performed electric racing motorcycle. Energica benefits from the close relationship and consultation with parent company CRP Group. Energica first prototypes were manufactured using 3D printing and F1 technologies.

Racing
In 2010 CRP designed and built the eCRP, the electric racing motorcycle. The eCRP 1.0 was presented during the "Cleaner Racing Conference" in Birmingham on January 13, 2010.
It was introduced by Lord Paul Drayson, UK's former Minister for Science and Innovation, with the support of the Motorsport Industry Association.

The eCRP, unlike most other electric racing motorcycles which were usually only a conversion of traditional combustion engines into electric vehicles, was created from the ground up as a real electric racing motorcycle, specifically designed for 100% electrical power.
In later 2010 the eCRP 1.2 made its debut on the track at Assen, in the TTXGP EU with the professional rider Alessandro Brannetti.

The eCRP 1.2 was the first competition version of the electric motorcycle made in CRP. On October 2 and 3 2010, the eCRP 1.2 competed at Brands Hatch and won the title of European Champion TTXGP 2010. The team went on the podium at the World Final Albacete, taking second place. 
In 2011 CRP developed a new version of the Italian electric racing motorcycle, the eCRP 1.4.
The use of Additive Manufacturing and the innovative materials of the Windform product line represented a crucial stage in the construction of the electric racing motorcycle, carried out in collaboration with CRP Technology.
The chassis of the electric racing motorcycle eCRP 1.4 featured a cast aluminum frame, welded aluminum swingarm and racing suspension.

The eCRP 1.4 was also equipped with a data logger and sensors with built-in GPS, a new racing dashboard, dual DC motor and integrated air cooling.
The eCRP 1.4 was ideally suited for the two new classes of TTXGP, Formula 75 and Open Formula GP, as widely demonstrated by eCRP 1.2.

After two years of racing, the eCRP team started working on the road version: Energica.

In a 2020 TechCrunch interview, CEO Livia Cevolini highlighted the company's involvement in racing as something that gives Energica a leg up in product development over other EV manufacturers, such as Zero Motorcycles. Because of racing, "We're in a different category," she said. "They have less power, less range and less fast charge capability."

In 2023, Energica will make history in MotoAmerica this coming race season when they become the first electric motorcycle brand to compete full time in a motorcycle road racing series against internal-combustion-engine motorcycles.

Model History

In 2012 CRP presented at EICMA the running prototype of Energica and in 2013 launched the first model Ego. The production Ego would eventually feature: multiple ride modes and levels of regenerative braking; a low-speed reverse mode; Bosch anti-lock braking system; a 100 kW oil-cooled, permanent-magnet AC motor; a 11.7 kW⋅h battery (nominal; max 13.4 kW⋅h), with a claimed range of 150 km at 80 km/h; and Mode-4 DC supercharging capability.

In April 2014, Ego45, the numbered luxury edition of Energica Ego, was displayed at Top Marques, Monte-Carlo.
In November 2014 CRP presented at EICMA the birth of Energica Motor Company S.p.A. and Energica Motor Company Inc., the US division.

That same year at EICMA, the new born company displayed the second model, Energica Eva. The Eva shared the same electric powertrain and chassis as the Ego with the motor limited to 80 kW of power and top speed limited to 200 km/h. The electric streetfighter was displayed alongside three Energica Ego configurations: Matte Pearl White, Matte Black and Energica Ego45 Carbon.

In 2016, delivery of the Eva began to customers. For MY2017, the power of the Ego was increased to 107 kW.

In 2017, Energica introduced its third model, the Eva EsseEsse9, with an "old school" design and more relaxed riding position, again sharing the powertrain and chassis as the Ego with the same power limits as the Eva. The Eva was also given a 107 kW version, known as the Eva 107, featuring the full 107 kW output of the Ego powertrain, electronically limited to a top speed of 200 km/h.

In 2018, Energica updated all its models with traction control, cruise control, and heated grips and increased the precision of its ride-by-wire throttles. Additional software improvements were introduced for current and previous models including user-definable charge interruption, a fanless "silent charging" mode, and up to 15% lower DC fast charge times.

In 2019, the Eva EsseEsse9+ and Ego+ were introduced, increasing battery capacity for the first time to 18.9 kW⋅h (nominal; max 21.5 kW⋅h), and increasing torque (200 Nm and 215 Nm respectively). The + models are 5% lighter than their standard versions with 60% more claimed range. Additionally, the Eva was superseded by the Eva Ribelle, sharing the same battery, torque, and power as the Ego+ with a top speed limited to 200 km/h.

In 2020, performance-oriented RS variants of the Ego+, Eva Ribelle, and Eva EsseEsse9+ were introduced with improved acceleration.

In 2022, the Experia touring motorbike was released.  This model features a new 22.5KwHr maximum (19.6KwHr nominal) battery, capable of 240 km touring and 400 km town range. While the 80 kW motor is less than the Ego and Eva models, and has a reduced top speed of 180 km/hr, it is lighter and is positioned lower than in the other models.

Dealers 

In 2014, Energica Motor Company published the official dealers network and announced the first Energica stores in US and Europe.

The interest in the Energica project is international, especially in North America, where the company has met real opportunities for collaboration both in the commercial and financial field.

Partners 

ChargePoint and Energica have partnered to provide quick and easy access to the public charging locations on the ChargePoint network. ChargePoint put the EGO through its Vehicle Interoperability Program (VIP) to ensure the bike's software supports charging on the ChargePoint network and all standard chargers.

At the beginning of 2015 Energica completed in Europe the fast charge protocol testing that allows Ego to charge 80% of the battery in less than 20minutes, using the 20 kW DC Chargers.

References

External links
Official website

Motorcycle manufacturers of Italy
Italian companies established in 2014
Electric motorcycles
Vehicle manufacturing companies established in 2014